John T. Rogers (1881 – 3 March 1937) won the 1927 Pulitzer Prize for Reporting, based on his coverage of the inquiry leading to the impeachment of federal judge George W. English. He was a journalist for the St. Louis Post-Dispatch.

References

External links

1881 births
1937 deaths
American male journalists
Pulitzer Prize for Reporting winners
20th-century American non-fiction writers
St. Louis Post-Dispatch people
20th-century American male writers